The Quebec – New England Transmission (officially known in Quebec as the Réseau multiterminal à courant continu (RMCC) and also known as Phase I / Phase II and the Radisson - Nicolet - Des Cantons circuit, and known in New England as the Northern Pass) is a long-distance high-voltage direct current (HVDC) line between Radisson, Quebec  and Westford Road in Ayer, Massachusetts. As of 2012, it remains one of only two Multi-terminal HVDC systems in the world (the other one being the Sardinia–Corsica–Italy system, completed in the same year) and is "the only multi-terminal bipole HVDC system in the world where three stations are interconnected and operate under a common master control system".

History
Initially, the Quebec – New England Transmission consisted of the  section between the Des Cantons station near Windsor, Quebec and the Frank D. Comerford Dam near Monroe, New Hampshire which, because of the asynchronous operation of the American and Québec power grids, had to be implemented as HVDC.  This bipolar electricity transmission line, which is overhead for its whole length except the crossing of Saint Lawrence river, went into service in 1986. It could transfer a maximum power of 690 megawatts. The operating voltage was ±450kV or 900 kV from line to line.

The transmission power was increased by extending the existing converter stations to 2,000 megawatts, with the value of the transmission voltage remaining unchanged at ±450 kV. For the connection of the Montreal area, a further converter station at Nicolet was put into service in 1992 with a transmission capacity of 2,000 megawatts.

The line crosses the Saint Lawrence River between Grondines and Lotbinière via a tunnel. Until the tunnel was built, the line crossed the river via an overhead lattice tower electricity pylon—portions of one of these towers would later be used as part of the observation tower at La Cité de l'Énergie in Shawinigan.

Failed Northern Pass initiative
In December 2008, Hydro-Québec, along with American utilities Northeast Utilities (parent company of Public Service of New Hampshire) and NSTAR (parent company of Boston Edison), created a joint venture to build a new HVDC line from Windsor, Quebec to Deerfield, New Hampshire, with an HVDC converter terminal intended to be built in Franklin, New Hampshire. Hydro-Québec would have owned the segment within Quebec, while the segment within the US would have been owned by Northern Pass Transmission LLC, a partnership between Northeast Utilities (75%) and NSTAR (25%). Estimated to cost US$1.1 billion to build, it was projected that the line would either run in existing right-of-way adjacent to the HVDC line that runs through New Hampshire, or it would have connected to a right-of-way in northern New Hampshire that runs through the White Mountains. This  line, projected to carry 1,200 megawatts, would have brought electricity to approximately one million homes.

In order to go ahead, the project needed to receive regulatory approval in Quebec and the United States. The proposed transmission line could have been in operation in 2015. According to Jim Robb, a senior executive from Northeast Utilities, New England could have met one third of its Regional Greenhouse Gas Initiative commitments with the hydropower coming through this new power line alone.

In October 2010, Northeast Utilities announced that it would merge with NSTAR, with the resulting company initially retaining the Northeast Utilities name. The deal was subject to regulatory approval. In effect, Northern Pass Transmission would have become a wholly owned subsidiary of Northeast Utilities, which was renamed Eversource Energy in 2015.

The purchase of power from Hydro-Québec was an issue during the Massachusetts gubernatorial election of 2010.

In July 2019, Eversource issued a statement that the Northern Pass project was now "off the table" after investing $318 million over a decade to develop and promote the project.

Construction of the New England Clean Energy Connect, a similar project, started in February 2021.
Massachusetts pursues it as an option to bring Canadian hydropower through transmission lines in Maine, estimated to cost $1 billion. Voters in 2021 expressed their disapproval of the project in the most expensive referendum in Maine history.

Sites

Important waypoints of the line.

Radisson to Nicolet

Nicolet to Des Cantons

Des Cantons to Comerford

Comerford to Ayer

Des Cantons to Deerfield
Route listed here reflects the primary route, and is currently projected.

Grounding electrodes 

Opposition

2004 Hydro tower bombing
In 2004, shortly before U.S. President George W. Bush's visit to Canada, a tower along the Quebec–New England Transmission circuit in the Eastern Townships near the Canada–US border was damaged by explosive charges detonated at its base. The CBC reported that a message, purportedly from the Résistance internationaliste and issued to the La Presse and Le Journal de Montréal newspapers and CKAC radio, stated that the attack had been carried out to "denounce the 'pillaging' of Quebec's resources by the United States".

2015: Sierra Club of New Hampshire
In November 2015, the Sierra Club of New Hampshire expressed opposition to the new line, saying that it would benefit Connecticut and Massachusetts residents more than those in New Hampshire, and expressing concerns about the flooding of boreal forests during the construction of Hydro-Québec's dams in northern Quebec, disputes with the Innu First Nations, and the effects on tourism and the environment within the White Mountain National Forest.

2011-Present: Local government and community opposition
A coalition of New Hampshire communities and local government officials oppose the construction of the expanded transmission line. Elected representatives from New Hampshire's 10 counties have expressed opposition, including 114 officials in the New Hampshire House of Representatives and 5 members of the New Hampshire Senate. United States Congressional Representative Carol Shea-Porter and Senators Maggie Hassan and Jeanne Shaheen also oppose expansion of the line. Some of the incumbent power companies in New England oppose it, while other companies favor it.

See also
Hydro-Québec
Hydro-Québec's electricity transmission system
Saint Lawrence River HVDC Powerline Crossing
Champlain Hudson Power Express

References

Bibliography

External links
 The HVDC Transmission Québec - New England
 Pictures of the Quebec - New England line in New England
 Northern Pass Transmission
 Bonneville Power Administration: Quebec - New England Transmission (via Internet Archive)
 Bonneville Power Administration: Schematics of Quebec - New England Transmission system (via Internet Archive) 

Electric power transmission systems in Canada
Energy in New England
Energy in Quebec
Electric power transmission systems in the United States
HVDC transmission lines
Hydro-Québec
James Bay Project